Dominic Alexander Charles Lewis (born January 29, 1985) is a British film and television composer. He first worked on various music departments for film projects before transitioning into more solo work starting with Free Birds. His other credits includes The Man in the High Castle, DuckTales, Peter Rabbit, Peter Rabbit 2: The Runaway, and Monsters at Work. He serves as the singing voice of Lurch in The Addams Family 2, and of Donald Duck in the DuckTales.

Life and career
Lewis was born and raised in London, England. Both his parents are musicians and he began learning the cello at age three. He also played the piano and guitar, sang in choirs, formed rock bands, and wrote songs while growing up. He cites his early influences as John Williams, Alan Silvestri, Strauss, Claude Debussy, Maurice Ravel, The Beatles, The Beach Boys, Eric Clapton, and Jimi Hendrix.

He studied at the Royal Academy of Music in London where he was classically trained in cello and music composition. During his time there, he was under the mentorship of film composer, Rupert Gregson-Williams. In 2009, Lewis relocated to Los Angeles, California to join Remote Control Productions. He served in the music departments of various major studio films under composers Henry Jackman, John Powell and Ramin Djawadi, usually in the capacity of providing additional music.

In 2014, Lewis was nominated for the Annie Award for Outstanding Achievement in Music in an Animated Feature Production for his work on the 2013 film Free Birds. In 2015, he was nominated for the World Soundtrack Award for Discovery of the Year for the 2015 film Spooks: The Greater Good. In 2016, he scored Jodie Foster's film Money Monster in under three weeks.

Lewis's close collaboration with Henry Jackman, led to the pair scoring Amazon's The Man in the High Castle. Both Lewis and Jackman co-scored the first season, while the second, third and fourth were scored by Lewis alone. Speaking about the project, Lewis employed an orchestral method but infused it with various traditional and ethnic instruments. He also developed character themes and assigned instruments like the cello for Juliana Crain and the french horn for Joe Blake.

In 2018, Lewis was hired to score the animated comedy film, Peter Rabbit directed by Will Gluck. He reunited with Gluck on the sequel, Peter Rabbit 2: The Runaway.

Filmography

Film

Main composer

Other credits

References

External links

 
 Dominic Lewis on Twitter

1985 births
21st-century British male musicians
21st-century English composers
Alumni of the Royal Academy of Music
English film score composers
English male film score composers
English television composers
Living people
Male television composers
Musicians from London